Ibrahim Aoudou (born 23 August 1955, in Mbalmayo) is a Cameroonian former professional footballer who played as a defender. He competed for the Cameroon national team at the 1982 FIFA World Cup as a winger. At a club level, he joined French club AS Cannes from Canon Yaoundé in 1981 and stayed three years there before ending his career with two short stints at RC Besancon and US Corte.

Aoudou also competed at the 1984 Summer Olympics.

In 2006, he was selected by CAF as one of the best 200 African football players of the last 50 years.

References

External links
 
 

1955 births
Living people
Association football defenders
Cameroonian footballers
Cameroonian expatriate footballers
Cameroon international footballers
Cameroonian Muslims
Olympic footballers of Cameroon
Footballers at the 1984 Summer Olympics
1982 FIFA World Cup players
1982 African Cup of Nations players
1984 African Cup of Nations players
1986 African Cup of Nations players
Africa Cup of Nations-winning players
Canon Yaoundé players
AS Cannes players
Racing Besançon players
USC Corte players
Expatriate footballers in France
Cameroonian expatriate sportspeople in France